Absolutely Fabulous (originally titled Ab Fab) is a British television sitcom.

Absolutely Fabulous may also refer to:

 "Absolutely Fabulous" (song), a 1994 song by English duo Pet Shop Boys
 Absolutely Fabulous: The Movie, a 2016 British comedy film based on the television show
 Absolutely Fabulous (2001 film), a 2001 French comedy film based on the television show
 Absolutely Fabulous: 20th Anniversary, a set of three special episodes of the television series